This is an alphabetical list of Armenian composers.

A
 Alain Altinoglu (born 1975)
 Charles Amirkhanian (born 1945)
 Robert Amirkhanyan (born 1939)
 Izabella Arazova (born 1936)
 Alexander Arutiunian (1920-2012)
 Sahan Arzruni (born 1943)
 Sergei Aslamazyan (1897-1978)
 Artur Avanesov (born 1980)
 Khachatur Avetisyan (1926-1996)
 Artemi Ayvazyan (1902-1975)

B

 Arno Babajanian (1921-1983)
 Vahram Babayan (born 1948)
 Edvard Baghdasaryan (1922-1987)
 Sergey Balasanian (1902-1982)
 Sargis Barkhudaryan (1887-1973)
 Hampartzoum Berberian (1905-1999)
 Schahan Berberian (1891-1956 )
 Gilbert Biberian (born 1944)

C
 Gayane Chebotaryan (1918-1998)
 Levon Chaushian (born 1946)
 Geghuni Hovannesi Chitchian (born 1929)
 Loris Ohannes Chobanian (born 1933)
 Tigran Chukhajian (1837-1898)

D
 Harutiun Dellalian (1937-1990)
 Yeghia Dndesian (1834-1881)
 Vyacheslav Dobrynin (born 1946)
 Paghtasar Dpir (1683-1768)
 Ohan Durian (1922-2011)

E
 Kemani Tatyos Ekserciyan (1858-1913)
 Stéphan Elmas (1862-1937)
 Angelo Ephrikian (1913-1982)

G

 Nicol Galanderian (1881-1944)
 Djivan Gasparyan (1928-2021)
 Koharik Gazarossian (1907-1967)
 Hambarsoom Grigorian (1893-1975)

H

 Varoujan Hakhbandian (1936-1977)
 Tigran Hamasyan (born 1987)
 Harutyun Hanesyan (1911-1987)
 Eduard Hayrapetyan (born 1949)
 Alan Hovhaness (1911-2000)
 Edgar Hovhannisyan (1930-1998)
 Gagik Hovunts (1930-2019)

J
 Jivani (1846-1909)
 Mihail Jora (1891-1971)

K

 Krikor Kalfayan (1873-1949)
 Sirvart Kalpakyan Karamanuk (1912-2008)
 Andrey Kasparov (born 1966)
 Yuri Kasparov (born 1955)
 Rita Kassabian (born ?)
 Aram Khachaturian (1903–1978)
 Karen Khachaturian (1920-2011)
 Khosrovidukht (lived in 8th century)
 Adam Khudoyan (1921-2000)
 Komitas (1869-1935)

L
 Hampartsoum Limondjian (1768-1839)

M

 Edgar Manas (1875-1964)
 Tigran Mansurian (1939)
 Edward Manukyan (born 1981)
 Mekhitar of Ayrivank (1230/35-1297/1300)
 Romanos Melikian (1883-1935)
 Hrachya Melikyan (1947-2006)
 Edvard Mirzoyan (1921-2012)
 Georgi Movsesyan (1945-2011)
 Vazgen Muradian (1921-2018)

N
 Nerses IV the Gracious (1102-1173)

O

 Konstantin Orbelyan (1928-2014)

P
 Stepan Papelyan (1875-1960)
 Boris Parsadanian (1925-1997)
 Krzysztof Penderecki (1933–2020)
 Konstantin Petrossian (born 1946)
 Michel Petrossian (born 1973)

RS

 Stepan Rostomyan (born 1956)
 Sahakdukht (lived in 8th century)
 Vardan Sardaryan (born 1962)
 Ruben Sargsyan (1945-2013)
 Vahram Sargsyan (born 1981)
 Ghazaros (Lazar) Saryan (1920-1998)
 Aram Satian (born 1947)
 David Satian (born 1979)
 Vache Sharafyan (born 1966)
 Petros Shoujounian (born 1957)
 Alexander Spendiaryan (1871-1928)
 Grikor Suni (1876-1939)

T
 Mikael Tariverdiev (1931-1996)
 Ohannes Tchekidjian (born 1929)
 Avet Terterian (1929-1994)
 Alicia Terzian (born 1934)
 Armen Tigranian (1879-1950)
 Nikoghayos Tigranian (1856-1951)
 Loris Tjeknavorian (born 1937)
 Onno Tunç (1948-1996)

W
 William Weiner (born 1955)

Y
 Grigor Yeghiazaryan (1908-1988)
 Makar Yekmalyan (1856-1905)

See also
 Chronological list of Armenian classical composers

References

  
Armenia
Composers